Khotianivka is a village in Vyshhorod Raion, Kyiv Oblast (province) of Ukraine. It hosts the administration of Vyshhorod urban hromada, one of the hromadas of Ukraine.

References

Villages in Vyshhorod Raion